Hong Sung-mi (born 17 July 1986), known professionally as Dana, is a South Korean singer, musical actress and vocal coach. Dana first made her public appearance with acts on the boy group H.O.T's sci-fi movie Age of Peace in 2000. Dana later made her official debut as a solo singer, with released full-album DANA (2001) and Maybe (2003). Concurrently with her music career in 2002, Dana made her acting debut with cast in the third season of MBC sitcom Nonstop and also made her musical theatre debut with cast as Wendy in Peterpan.

After she took a break for almost two-years, Dana returned with debuting as a member of girl group The Grace in April 2005. Through the group's career, they releases and performs music in Korean and Japanese with a total of three studio albums. In mid 2010, the group's halted all their activities and focusing their own activities. In July 2011, the groups returned with formed duo sub-unit Dana & Sunday with only released single "One More Chance" before also took a break.

Dana returned in musical theatre with cast in Daejanggeum Season Three, Rock of Ages, The Three Musketeers in 2010. Following this, she earned a number of roles, appearing in the notably musical Catch Me If You Can (2012), Bonnie and Clyde (2013), The Great Gatsby Re:Boot (2016). In 2016, Dana later returned to the music industry with promoting her single "Touch You" through released under SM Station.

Career

2001–2003: Career Beginnings
Prior to debuting in a girl group, she promoted as an actress in popular boyband H.O.T's Age of Peace movie and in Kangta's "Polaris" music video.

Starting off as a solo artist under Lee Soo Man's SM Entertainment label, Dana was labeled the "next BoA".

In 2001, she released her fairly successful debut single "Sesang kkeut kkaji" (Until The end of The World), which was an adapted song of "Tell Me No More Lies" composed by European songwriter Stefan Aberg. She followed up with "Diamond", a pop/dance track featuring Jung Yunho (U-Know, who eventually became a member of TVXQ in 2003).

Her career blossomed and was furthered through appearances on variety shows, such as X-Man, as well as playing a main role in the sitcom Nonstop. Her second album "Maybe" was released in 2003; however, it sold poorly. From that point on, she disappeared from the music industry (aside from SMTOWN collaborations) until the debut of The Grace.

2005–2011: The Grace and Dana & Sunday

Dana redebuted as a member of South Korea girl group The Grace in 2005. The group debuted on 29 April 2005 in China and 1 May 2005 in South Korea. For the group's fourth Japanese single, she composed the music to her own solo song "Sayonara No Mukou Ni".As of 2010, the group was indefinite hiatus.

Starting in May 2010, Dana started her musical acting career with played role on Daejanggeum Season Three. Later the same year, she starred in Rock of Ages as Sherrie.

In late 2010 and early 2011, she starred as Constance in The Three Musketeers. She commented in an interview about being nervous about having to kiss Super Junior Kyuhyun.

In June 2011, an image was leaked of SM Entertainment's itinerary for 2011 which included a release for a new single by CSJH. SM later confirmed that CSJH would be making a comeback with a new image. On 8 July 2011, CSJH's Dana & Sunday made a comeback as a sub-unit with a digital single titled 'One More Chance'; the single was released on 11 July.

2012–present: Solo activities
From March 2012 to June 2012, she was cast as Brenda Strong for the re-run of the musical Catch Me If You Can. In September 2013, she starred as Bonnie for the musical Bonnie and Clyde. In February 2014, she returned to cast as Constance  in The Three Musketeers. In early 2015, she was cast as Joy for the musical Robin Hood.

After 13 years, Dana returned as soloist with release "Touch You" on 20 May 2016, as a part of SM Entertainment project SM Station. To promote the song, Dana performed on several music programs, The Show, M Countdown, Music Bank, Show! Music Core and Inkigayo from May 24–28, 2016. 

In December 2018, Dana starred her first reality show Danalda aired on Lifetime cable channel. The reality show containing Dana's diet challenge after break-up and losing her close brother.

On June 24, 2020, it was reported that Dana would be leaving SM Entertainment after 19 years. SM Entertainment confirmed the news and added, “Our exclusive contract with Dana ended recently. We hope people will continue to support her in her future activities.”

Personal life
On 4 May 2016, during MBC's Radio Star, Dana revealed that she had been in a relationship for three years. It was later revealed that Dana's boyfriend is Lee Ho-jae, who is a film/music video director. On 6 November 2018, SM Entertainment announced that the couple broke up.

Discography

Studio albums

Single

Compilations

Songs written by Dana

Filmography

Film

Drama

Television

Musical theater

Videography

Solo Music Video
 세상끝까지
 Diamond
 남겨둔 이야기 (Maybe)
 What is Love (Original Ver.)

Awards

South Korean Performing Arts Awards

Mnet Asian Music Awards

MTV Style Awards

Special awards

Chinese Ministry of Culture

References

External links

 Dana official website 

1986 births
K-pop singers
Living people
Singers from Seoul
South Korean female idols
South Korean television actresses
South Korean film actresses
South Korean women pop singers
SM Town
SM Entertainment artists
21st-century South Korean women singers